Yvan Ducharme was a québécois actor (24 August 1937, in Rouyn-Noranda – 21 March 2013 in Laval, Quebec).

Biography
Ducharme was first known to the public thanks to his creation of Insolences d'un téléphone shown during the day in 1963 on CJMS in Montreal for more than a decade.

He became popular on Quebec television with the role of the father in Les Berger and won many awards including Monsieur Télévision in 1972.

Ducharme also painted for many years in his apartment in Montreal. He created his own abstract style which he named "impulsionnism".
The most recent creations of Yvan Ducharme were shown in Montreal in February 2007, in Longueuil in May 2007, and in Rouyn-Noranda, his place of birth, in August 2007.

Ducharme died on 21 March 2013 from chronic obstructive pulmonary disease. He was 75.

Filmography
 1965 : Pas de vacances pour les idoles
 1969 : Valérie : Le gérant de Club
 1970 - 1976  : Les Berger (TV series) : Guy Berger
 1971 : Let's Call the Whole Thing Orff (TV series)
 1972 : The Rebels (Quelques arpents de neige)
 1973 : Y'a toujours moyen de moyenner! : Yvan
 1974 : Bulldozer : Mainchaude
 1980 : Suzanne : Eddy
 1976 : Du tac au tac (TV series) : Buddy Taillefer (1980–1982)
 1982 : Visiting Hours : Policeman 1
 1994 : The Wind from Wyoming (Le Vent du Wyoming) : Légionnaire
 2000 : Chartrand et Simonne (TV series) : Contremaître
 2000 : 2001: A Space Travesty : Famous Tenor #3
 2004 : Happy Camper (Camping sauvage) : Père de Bouton

Awards and nominations

Awards
 1963 : Comedy radio show of the year Ducharme au réveil & Les insolences d'un téléphone
 1965 : Radio show of the year Ducharme au réveil & Les insolences d'un téléphone
 1968 : Radio personality of the year
 1972 : Monsieur Télévision

Nominations

References

External links
 Official site of Yvan Ducharme
 

1937 births
2013 deaths
Canadian male film actors
Canadian male television actors
French Quebecers
Male actors from Quebec
People from Rouyn-Noranda